Sibley is a ghost town in Cloud County, Kansas, United States.  It is located north of Concordia and the Republican River.

History
Sibley was founded in 1869, and named for Lake Sibley. It was once in the running for the county seat but lost in an 1870 run-off election against Concordia.  The area is now abandoned as a town and the land is privately owned and used for farming.  It is considered a ghost town.

Notable people
 May Louise Cowles, economist who studied clothing consumption and consumer behavior

References

Further reading

External links
 Cloud County maps: Current, Historic, KDOT

Former populated places in Cloud County, Kansas
Former populated places in Kansas